McWilliams v. Dunn, 582 U.S. __ (2017), is a United States Supreme Court ruling that clarified Ake v. Oklahoma in relation to the case of convicted murderer, rapist and robber James E. McWilliams.

The Court ruled 5–4 in favour of Williams on the grounds of the defendant not having access to an independent mental health expert during his trial with the lower appellate court not considering this in the previous appeal, as written in the opinion authored by Justice Breyer.

See also 

 Ake v. Oklahoma, 470 U.S. 68 (1985)

References

External links 

 Full Judgement and Dissent

2017 in United States case law
Death penalty case law
United States criminal due process case law
United States Supreme Court cases
United States Supreme Court cases of the Roberts Court